James Jones may refer to:

Sports

Association football
James Jones (footballer, born 1873) (1873–1955), British Olympic footballer 
James Jones (footballer, born 1996), Scottish footballer for Wrexham 
James Jones (footballer, born 1997), Welsh footballer for Barrow

American football
James Jones (defensive lineman) (born 1969), defensive lineman for Cleveland Browns, Denver Broncos, Baltimore Ravens, Detroit Lions
James Jones (running back, born 1958), running back for the Dallas Cowboys
James Jones (running back, born 1961), running back for Detroit Lions and Seattle Seahawks
James Jones (wide receiver) (born 1984)
James "T" Jones (1931-2020), former college football player, coach and athletic director

Basketball
James Jones (basketball, born 1964), American basketball coach
James Jones (basketball, born 1980), American basketball executive and former player in the NBA
Jimmy Jones (basketball) (born 1945), American former basketball player in the ABA and NBA

Cricket
James Jones (cricketer, born 1885) (1885–1953), cricketer for Somerset and Glamorgan in the 1920s
James Jones (cricketer, born 1870) (1870–1960), English cricketer

Other sports
James Phillips Jones (1883–1964), Welsh international rugby union utility player
James Jones (baseball) (born 1988), American baseball player
James Jones (sport shooter) (1871–1955), Canadian Olympic shooter
James Jones (rugby league) (fl. 1930), New Zealand rugby league player

Political figures

United States
James Jones (Georgia politician) (died 1801), Congressman, namesake of Jones County, Georgia
James Jones (South Dakota politician) (1927–2014), South Dakota politician
James Jones (Virginia politician) (1772–1848), U.S. Representative from Virginia
James A. Jones (1820–1894), Virginia State Senate, Constitutional Convention of 1850
James B. Jones (1886–1947), lieutenant governor of New Mexico
James C. Jones (1809–1859), governor of Tennessee
James F. Jones Jr. (born 1934), Pennsylvania politician
James G. Jones (born 1934), United States Air Force general
James H. Jones (Texas politician) (1830–1904), U.S. Representative from Texas
James H. Jones (North Carolina politician) (died 1921), coachman and confidential courier for Jefferson Davis and later a local public official in North Carolina
James Herbert Jones (1920–2008), Arkansas State Auditor, Adjutant General of the Arkansas National Guard
James I. Jones (1786–1858), major general from New York
James Kimbrough Jones (1839–1908), chairman of the Democratic National Committee
James L. Jones (born 1943), former National Security Advisor and 32nd Commandant of the United States Marine Corps
James L. Jones Sr. (1912–1986), officer in the United States Marine Corps
James McHall Jones (1823–1851), U.S. federal judge
James M. Jones (1862–1928), Mayor of Kansas City, Missouri
James M. Jones, Jr., mayor of Birmingham, Alabama
James Parker Jones (born 1940), U.S. federal judge
James R. Jones (born 1939), Congressman from Oklahoma and U.S. Ambassador to Mexico
James R. Jones (Virginia politician) American politician in the Virginia House of Delegates and Virginia Senate
James S. Jones, American politician in the Virginia House of Delegates
James T. Jones (1832–1895), U.S. Representative from Alabama
James Wormley Jones (1884–1958), African-American policeman, World War I veteran, and FBI agent

Other countries
Idwal Jones (politician) (James Idwal Jones, 1900–1982), Welsh politician
Jim Jones (Canadian politician) (born 1943), Canadian politician
James William Jones (1869–1954), merchant, realtor and political figure in British Columbia, Canada

Religious figures
James F. Jones (minister) (1907–1971), African American religious leader and founder of the Church of Universal Triumph, Dominion of God, Inc.
Jim Jones (James Warren Jones, 1931–1978), cult leader of the Peoples Temple responsible for the collective suicide at Jonestown, Guyana
James Jones (bishop) (born 1948), former Anglican Bishop of Liverpool
James Jones (priest, born 1881) (1881–1980), Church of England priest
James Jones (priest, born 1730) (1730–1823), Archdeacon of Hereford
Kilsby Jones (James Rhys Jones, 1813–1889), Welsh minister, writer and lecturer

Arts and entertainment
James Jones (author) (1921–1977), American novelist
James Earl Jones (born 1931), American actor
James Cellan Jones (1931–2019), British television and film director
James Jones (documentary maker) (born 1982), British documentary film-maker
James T. Jones IV (died 1996), American music journalist
Middle Walter (1935–1986), American blues harmonica player, born James Jones
Jimmy Jones (singer) (1937–2012), American singer, born James Jones
T. James Jones (born 1934), Welsh poet and dramatist
James Jones (Born 1998), Welsh multi-instrumentalist

Other people
James Addison Jones (1869–1950), founder of J.A. Jones Construction
James Jones (civil servant) (1914–1995), Scottish civil servant
James F. Jones (educator) (born 1947), president of Trinity College, Hartford, Connecticut
James Matthew Jones (born 1961), American global public health expert and consultant
James W. Jones (1809–1892), civil engineer in Adelaide, South Australia
James Jones (psychologist), American social psychologist
James McHenry Jones (1859–1909), American educator, school administrator, businessperson, and minister

Characters
Jimbo Jones, one of the main bullies in The Simpsons

See also
Jim Jones (disambiguation)
Jimmy Jones (disambiguation)
Jamie Jones (disambiguation)